Orunia Górna-Gdańsk Południe (translated Higher Orunia and Gdańsk South) is the 35th and youngest of the administrative districts (dzielnica administracyjna) of the city of Gdańsk, Poland. It was created on March 24, 2019 by decision of the city council on August 30, 2018.

Location 
From the north, the quarter is bordered by the district of Chełm, from the east by Orunia-Św. Wojciech-Lipce, from the south by the rural gminas Pruszcz Gdański and Kolbudy and from the west by the district of Ujeścisko-Łostowice.

Quarters of Orunia Górna-Gdańsk Południe are:
 Orunia Górna (translated Higher Orunia)
 Maćkowy
 Borkowo (Borgfeld) with
 Cztery Pory Roku (translated Four seasons)
 Moje Marzenie (My dream)
 Os. Kolorowe (Coloured quarter).

History 
In 2010, the fast growing district of Chełm i Gdańsk Południe with a population of about 72,000 has been divided in the districts of Chełm and Ujeścisko-Łostowice. When Chełm reached a population of 51,000, the city council decided for a second division in the smaller district of Chełm and the district Orunia Górna-Gdańsk Południe.

In World War II, a subdivision of Stalag XXB or Stalag 20B Marienburg Danzig was established in the area of this district. Stalags had been German POW camps. Near Matzkau the Strafvollzugslager Danzig-Matzkau, a German prison camp for members of SS and police troops had been erected. Convicts from the camp became members of the Dirlewanger Brigade. Nearby Außenstelle Matzkau, a sub-camp of the Stutthof concentration camp had been established. In 1973, the village of Maćkowy became part of the city of Gdańsk.

Tourism 
Tourist attractions:
The modern church św. Jadwigi Królowej in Orunia Górna.

References

External links 

 Podział administracyjny Gdańska (Polish)
 gedanopedia.pl: Orunia Górna (Polish)
 gedanopedia.pl: Borkowo (Polish)
 gedanopedia.pl: Maćkowy (Polish)

Districts of Gdańsk